This is a list of lighthouses in Maldives.

Lighthouses

See also
 Lists of lighthouses and lightvessels

References

External links

 

Maldives
Lighthouses
Lighthouses